Joel Luani (born 16 February 1992) is a professional rugby league footballer who last played for the Canterbury-Bankstown Bulldogs in the Intrust Super Premiership.

Background
Luani was born in Sydney, New South Wales, Australia. He is of American Samoan and Tongan descent.

He was educated at his father's alma mater Newington College (2008–2010) and he played in the rugby union 1st XV for three years. In his final year of school he was a member of Newington's GPS Championship-winning rugby union team and played for the Australian Schoolboys rugby union team. He also played junior football for Five Dock before being signed by the Wests Tigers.

Playing career
Luani played for the Tigers' NYC team in 2011 and 2012, playing second row in the 2012 premiership-winning team. Coach Todd Payten said, "Joel played in the back row, which was not his preferred position and not once did he complain. He just went out and did the job each week."

On 29 July 2013, Luani re-signed with the Tigers on a 2-year contract.

After being 18th man a number of times in the 2013 NRL season, Luani made his NRL debut for the Tigers against the Parramatta Eels in round 22. He played 3 games in a period when Robbie Farah was unavailable due to injury, scoring one try.

At the end of the season, Luani was chosen to be a member of the United States 2013 World Cup squad. He made his international debut playing at hooker in the side that defeated the Cook Islands 32-20, in the country's first ever World Cup match.

Luani made his debut for Tonga at the end of 2014. In 2015, he played halfback in a mid-season test against Samoa, and was described as one of, "the halves changing perceptions of Pacific rugby league teams having an inability to produce quality playmakers."

He represented Tonga again at the conclusion of the 2015 season in the Asia-Pacific Qualifier match against the Cook Islands for the 2017 Rugby League World Cup, but he played this game in his usual position of hooker, with usual hooker Pat Politoni starting at five-eighth.

Luani didn't play in any first-grade games for the Tigers in 2015 and at the end of the season, was not re-signed by the club.

References

External links
2015 Wests Tigers profile

1992 births
Living people
Australian people of American descent
Australian sportspeople of Samoan descent
Australian sportspeople of Tongan descent
Australian rugby league players
Australian rugby union players
Balmain Ryde-Eastwood Tigers players
People educated at Newington College
Rugby league hookers
Rugby league players from Sydney
Tonga national rugby league team players
United States national rugby league team players
Wests Tigers NSW Cup players
Wests Tigers players